The 2002 Rishon LeZion bombing was a suicide bombing which occurred on 7 May 2002 at a crowded game club located in the new industrial area of Rishon Lezion. 16 people were killed in the attack and 55 were injured.

The Islamic militant group Hamas claimed responsibility for the attack.

The attack
On Tuesday, 7 May 2002 at 11:03 pm, a Palestinian suicide bomber detonated a hidden explosive device within a crowded game club full of people located in the new industrial area of Rishon Lezion, only 10 km south of Tel Aviv, killing 15 civilians and injuring 55 people, 10 critically.

After the attack the Israeli police stated that the suicide bomber was carrying a briefcase full of explosives and in addition was also wearing an explosive belt. The police estimated that the total weight of explosives were between 7 and 8 kilograms, and stated that the briefcase contained also metal fragments and bolts in order to maximize the number of casualties in the attack.

The perpetrators 
The Islamic militant group Hamas claimed responsibility for the attack.

Aftermath 
The attack was condemned by United Nations Secretary General Kofi Annan.

After the attack, Irina Polishchuk, a Ukrainian married to Palestinian-Arab Ibrahim Sarahne, was caught and convicted of participating in the 2002 Rishon LeZion bombing for her part in delivering the bomber to the site of the attack.

Release of attack collaborator 

On 18 October 2011, Polishchuk, who had originally been sentenced to 20 years imprisonment, was released to the West Bank as part of the Gilad Shalit prisoner exchange between Israel and Hamas.

References

External links 
 Suicide bomber kills 15 in Israel – published on 8 May 2002 in The Guardian
 Lin: The aftermath of the Rishon Letzion attack  – published on 8 May 2002 on CNN
 Israeli Embassy Statement on 7 May Rishon LeZion Bombing – published on 8 May 2002 on jewishfederations.org

Mass murder in 2002
Suicide bombings in 2002
Hamas suicide bombings
Terrorist incidents in Israel in 2002
May 2002 events in Asia
Islamic terrorist incidents in 2002
Islamic terrorism in Israel